Imagine was the name of a cutting-edge 3D modeling and ray tracing program, originally for the Amiga computer and later also for MS-DOS and Microsoft Windows. It was created by Impulse, Inc. It used the .iob extension for its objects. Imagine was a derivative of the software TurboSilver, which was also for the Amiga and written by Impulse. CAD-Technologies continued the distribution of the Amiga version. Starting with version 5.1, new updates were available for free for current customers as part of the Amiga Constant Upgrade Program (ACUP) up until presumed Imagine 6.0 release.

Versions
Amiga

 1990 Imagine
 1992 Imagine 2.0
 1993 Imagine 2.9
 1994 Imagine 3.0
 1995 Imagine 3.1
 1995 Imagine 3.2
 1995 Imagine 3.3
 1995 Imagine 4.0
 1996 Imagine 5.0
 1998 Imagine 5.1 and 5.1a, first ACUP release
1998 Imagine 5.13
 2000 Imagine 5.17
 2006 Imagine 5.19, last public release
MS-DOS

 1993 Imagine 2.0
 1994 Imagine 3.0
 1995 Imagine 4.0
Windows

1996 Imagine 1.0
1997 Imagine 1.3.4, first CUP release
1999 Imagine 1.9
 1999 Imagine 2.0
1999 Imagine 2.1.2
2000 Imagine 2.1.3
2000 Imagine 2.1.4, No Bones
2002 Imagine 2.1.5
2002 Imagine 2.1.6, release and additional effects (*.ifx files)
2002 Imagine 2.1.7
2002 Imagine 2.1.8 release and additional effect (FireRing.ifx file)
2004 Imagine 2.1.9, last public release, added Volumetric

See also 

Sculpt 3D

References

External links 
Program for reading IOB files 
Aminet Imagine traces
Imagine 3D fan site

1990 software
3D graphics software
Amiga raytracers
Amiga software